Okker is a Dutch surname. Notable people with the surname include:

Simon Okker (1881–1944), Dutch épée fencer
Tom Okker (born 1944), Dutch professional tennis player

Dutch-language surnames